The eighth season of American talent show competition series America's Got Talent was broadcast on NBC from June 4 to September 18, 2013. Following the previous season, Sharon Osbourne left the program following a dispute with the network, leading to Mel B replacing her. The judging panel was expanded with Heidi Klum serving as a fourth judge. Along with these changes, the live rounds for this season were moved to Radio City Music Hall in New York.

The eighth season was won by mime dancer Kenichi Ebina, the first foreign act to win the American competition. Stand-up comedian Taylor Williamson finished in second, with singer and guitarist Jimmy Rose placing third. During its broadcast, the season averaged around over 10.1 million viewers.

Season overview 

Auditions for the eighth season's competition took place between January and May 2013, in a far wider number of venues. Open auditions were held between January and February in Seattle, Portland (Oregon), Birmingham (Alabama), Memphis, Nashville, Savannah, Raleigh, Norfolk and Columbus. New Orleans, San Antonio, New York City, Los Angeles and Chicago also held open auditions (along with judges' auditions from March to May). Prior to production beginning, Sharon Osbourne became involved in a dispute with NBC, following the conclusion of the seventh season. Due to the treatment of her son in another of the network's programs, the dispute fundamentally culminated in her departing from the show.

Initially, executive producer Simon Cowell had wanted Carmen Electra to replace Osbourne on the program, but the decision was made to find someone else and expand the judging panel to incorporate four judges. This format change was first introduced on the sixth season of Britain's Got Talent. Singer Mel B became the fourth judge, which was announced on February 20, 2013. On March 3, supermodel Heidi Klum was revealed as Osbourne's replacement. During filming, Howie Mandel was absent on the first day of auditions in Los Angeles for personal reasons.

Following the previous season, some changes were made for the live rounds. After moving to the New Jersey Performing Arts Center in season seven to accommodate new judge Howard Stern, it was announced that the live shows would be presented from Radio City Music Hall in New York City. Both the YouTube and Wildcard quarter-finals were dropped from the schedule, and replaced with a standard fifth quarter-final round, with the Wildcard format adjusted. Judges could only select one eliminated quarter-finalist each as their Wildcard act, but their choice would be granted an automatic place in the semi-finals as a result. Additionally, any participant who reached the grand-final stage of the competition would be required to conduct two different performances, although the second routine would be done with a guest performer to accompany the style of their act. For example, a singer's second performance would have the potential of involving another singer to sing a duet with them.

Of the participants who auditioned for this season, sixty secured a place in the live quarter-finals, with twelve quarter-finalists in each one. About twenty of these advanced and were split between the two semi-finals, including three quarter-finalists chosen as Wildcard acts, along with the last-minute addition that had previously withdrew before the live rounds. Twelve semi-finalists secured a place in the finals, and six finalists secured a place in the grand-final. The following below lists the results of each participant's overall performance in this season:

 |  |  | 
 |  |  Wildcard Semi-finalist

  Red Panda originally had a place in the quarter-finals, but were forced to withdraw for personal reasons. While they later returned as a WildCard semi-finalist, their quarter-final place was given to Melody Caballero as a direct result.

Quarter-finals summary
 Buzzed Out |  Judges' choice | 
 |

Quarter-final 1 (July 23) 
Guest Performers, Results Show: The Rockettes, Labrinth, and Emeli Sandé

Quarter-final 2 (July 30) 
Guest Performers, Results Show: Robin Thicke, Brad Paisley

  Due to the nature of the Aquanuts' performance, their quarter-final routine had to be pre-recorded at another location.
  Tone the Chiefrocca was later appointed as Mel B's WildCard semi-finalist.

Quarter-final 3 (August 6) 
Guest Performers, Results Show: Marion Ross, and Jason Derulo

  Due to the majority vote for Chicago Boyz, Klum's voting intention was not revealed.
  Leon Etienne & Romy Low were later appointed as Howard Stern's WildCard semi-finalist.

Quarter-final 4 (August 13) 
Guest Performers, Results Show: Backstreet Boys

Quarter-final 5 (August 20) 
Guest Performers, Results Show: Tom Cotter, Train, and Ashley Monroe

  For health and safety reasons, Sam Johnson's quarter-final performance had to be pre-recorded at another location.
  Duo Resonance were later appointed as Heidi Klum's WildCard semi-finalist.

Semi-finals summary
 Buzzed Out |  Judges' choice | 
 |

Semi-final 1 (August 27) 
Guest Performers, Results Show: One Direction, and Cassadee Pope

Semi-final 2 (September 3) 
Guest Performers, Results Show: Fall Out Boy, and Team iLuminate

  Kristef Brothers had to perform in the second semi-final, due to an accident in rehearsals. Red Panda were given their place in the first semi-final, both as a last-minute replacement and as Howie Mandel's WildCard act.

Finals summary

Final - Top 12 (September 10) 
Guest Performers, Results Show: Terry Fator, and Olate Dogs

 |

Grand-Final (September 17) 
Guest Performers, Results Show: The Rockettes, Icona Pop, Earth, Wind & Fire, Luke Bryan

 |  |

Ratings
The following ratings are based upon those published by Nielsen Media Research after this season's broadcast:

Recap Episodes

  The weekly rank for these episodes is unknown, due to each not being amongst the 25 highest rated shows of their respective week.

References

2013 American television seasons
America's Got Talent seasons